Meuspath is a municipality in the district of Ahrweiler, in Rhineland-Palatinate, Germany.

Local business
Meuspath is the home of wige Solutions gmbh, who provide official timing data for motorsports events such as the 24 Hours Nürburgring.

References

Ahrweiler (district)